The Institute of Technology, Sligo (ITS) was an institute of technology, located in Sligo, Ireland. In April 2022, it was formally dissolved, and its functions became part of Atlantic Technological University (ATU). As of 2021, the institute had three faculties and nine departments.

History
The institute opened in 1970 as a Regional Technical College, and adopted its present name on 7 May 1997. The first students graduated with degrees from Sligo RTC in 1986.

Con Power served as principal of the college from its foundation in 1972 until 1979. Prof. Terri Scott was the institute's first female president, serving from 2008 until 2014. She was succeeded by Prof. Vincent Cunnane in October 2014. Dr. Brendan McCormack was appointed president of the institute in September 2016.

Development

IT Sligo developed a number of distance learning options, and as of 2016 reportedly had 1,800 online learners registered on various online programmes. This subsequently increased to approximately 3000 online learners.

In sports, the college has both ladies' soccer and men's Gaelic football teams, the latter winning the Sigerson Cup three times during the six years up to 2005.

In technology, IT Sligo's "Team Hermes" won the software design category of the 2011 Microsoft Imagine Cup (a world student technology competition, held in 2011 in New York).

Atlantic Technological University

As of October 2018, Sligo IT was reportedly working with GMIT and Letterkenny IT to potentially form a Technological University for the West/North-West of Ireland. In October 2020, the constituent IT's were allocated over €5.5 million towards transformation.

Formal approval was granted in October 2021. Atlantic TU began formal operations in April 2022.

Gallery

References

External links
Official site - Institute of Technology, Sligo (as ATU)
Official site - Atlantic Technological University
Official site - I.T. Sligo Students' Union

Atlantic Technological University
Institute Of Technology, Sligo
Institute Of Technology, Sligo
Universities and colleges in the Republic of Ireland
Institutes of technology in the Republic of Ireland
Educational institutions established in 1970
Educational institutions disestablished in 2022
Former universities and colleges in the Republic of Ireland
Institute Of Technology, Sligo
Institute Of Technology, Sligo